Virne Beatrice "Jackie" Mitchell Gilbert (August 29, 1913 – January 7, 1987) was one of the first female pitchers in professional baseball history. She was 17 years old when she pitched for the Chattanooga Lookouts Class AA minor league baseball team in an exhibition game against the New York Yankees, and struck out Babe Ruth and Lou Gehrig in succession.

Early life
Jackie Mitchell was born August 29, 1913 in Chattanooga, Tennessee, to Virne Wall Mitchell and Dr. Joseph Mitchell. When she learned how to walk, her father took her to the baseball diamond and taught her the basics of the game. Her next door neighbor, Dazzy Vance, taught her to pitch and showed her his "drop ball", a type of breaking ball.  Vance was a major league pitcher and would eventually be inducted into the Baseball Hall of Fame.

At the age of 17, Mitchell began playing for the Engelettes, a women's team in Chattanooga, Tennessee, and went on to attend a baseball training camp in Atlanta, Georgia. In doing so she attracted the attention of Joe Engel, the president and owner of the Chattanooga Lookouts, who was known for using publicity stunts as a way to draw crowds during the Great Depression. Seeing Mitchell as an opportunity to draw attention to the Lookouts, he signed her to the team on March 25, 1931. She appeared in her first professional game on April 2, becoming only the second woman to play organized baseball, behind Lizzie Arlington who pitched for the Reading Coal Heavers against the Allentown Peanuts in a minor league game in 1898.

Against the New York Yankees
The  Yankees and the Chattanooga Lookouts were scheduled to play an exhibition game in Chattanooga, Tennessee, on April 1, 1931, however, due to rain the game was postponed until the next day. Seventeen-year-old Mitchell was brought in to pitch during the first inning by Lookouts manager Bert Niehoff after the starting pitcher, Clyde Barfoot, gave up a double and a single. The next two batters were Babe Ruth and Lou Gehrig. After taking a ball, Ruth swung and missed at the next two pitches. Mitchell's fourth pitch to Ruth was a called third strike. Babe Ruth glared and verbally abused the umpire before being led away by his teammates to sit to wait for another batting turn. The crowd roared for Jackie. Babe Ruth was quoted in a Chattanooga newspaper as having said: 
"I don't know what's going to happen if they begin to let women in baseball. Of course, they will never make good. Why? Because they are too delicate. It would kill them to play ball every day."

Next up was "the Iron Horse" Lou Gehrig, who swung through the first three pitches to strike out, and Jackie Mitchell became famous for striking out two of the greatest baseball players in history.

Later career
A few days after Mitchell struck out Ruth and Gehrig,  Kenesaw Mountain Landis voided her contract and declared that women were unfit to play baseball as the game was "too strenuous." However, Mitchell continued to play professionally, barnstorming with the House of David, a men's team famous for their very long hair and long beards.  While traveling with the House of David team, she would sometimes wear a fake beard for publicity.

She refused to come out of retirement when the All-American Girls Professional Baseball League formed in 1943. Major League Baseball would formally ban the signing of women to contracts on June 21, . The ban lasted until  when Carey Schueler was drafted by the Chicago White Sox for the 1993 season.

In  Mitchell was invited to throw out the ceremonial first pitch for the Chattanooga Lookouts on their season opening day.

Jackie Mitchell died in Fort Oglethorpe, Georgia, on January 7, 1987, and was buried in Forest Hills Cemetery in Chattanooga.

Legacy 
A musical about Mitchell's life entitled Unbelievable was developed by Kevin Fogarty (lyrics), Rachel DeVore Fogarty (music), and John Robert DeVore (book).  It debuted in a staged reading on March 17, 2017, at Skyline Theatre Company in Bergen County, New Jersey.

On May 27, 2017, the Chattanooga Lookouts honored Mitchell with a limited edition bobblehead to the 1st 1,000 fans who entered the stadium.

See also
 Dr. Alta Weiss – pitched for the Vermilion Independents then the Weiss All Stars starting in 1907
 Mamie Johnson – pitched for the Indianapolis Clowns in the 1953–1955 seasons
 Ila Borders – pitched for the St. Paul Saints starting in 1997 then several other teams and retired from minor league baseball in 2000
 Eri Yoshida – pitched for the Kobe 9 Cruise of the Kansai Independent Baseball League starting in the 2009 season
 Pitch, a 2016 Fox TV series about a woman playing Major League Baseball
 Women in baseball

References

Further reading

External links
 Her Curves Were Too Much For Them: the Story of Jackie Mitchell

American female baseball players
Minor league baseball players
Baseball pitchers
Sportspeople from Chattanooga, Tennessee
Sportspeople from Fall River, Massachusetts
People from Fort Oglethorpe, Georgia
Baseball players from Massachusetts
Baseball players from Georgia (U.S. state)
1913 births
1987 deaths
20th-century American women
20th-century American people